Steven George Avery (born August 18, 1966) is a former professional American football running back in the National Football League. He was originally signed by the Houston Oilers as an undrafted rookie free agent in 1989. He played college football at Northern Michigan. He also played for the Green Bay Packers and Pittsburgh Steelers in addition to the Birmingham Fire of the World League of American Football.

Early years
Avery was born in Milwaukee and attended Brookfield Central High School in Brookfield, Wisconsin. He then attended Northern Michigan University.

Professional career
After going undrafted in the 1989 NFL Draft Avery was signed by the Houston Oilers where he spent one season, appearing in one game. After not playing in 1990, he was signed by the Green Bay Packers where he again appeared in one game. He again spent a season not playing in 1992. In 1993, he signed with the Pittsburgh Steelers where he would play for three seasons. In 1994, he appeared in 14 games with one start and recorded two carries for four yards and one reception for two yards. In 1995, his final season as a professional, Avery appeared in 11 games with two starts and recorded one carry for three yards and 11 receptions for 82 yards and one touchdown.

References

1966 births
Living people
Players of American football from Milwaukee
American football running backs
Birmingham Fire players
Houston Oilers players
Green Bay Packers players
Pittsburgh Steelers players
Northern Michigan Wildcats football players
Northern Michigan University alumni